The Foudre was a French seaplane carrier, the first in history. Her development followed the invention of the seaplane in 1910 with the French Le Canard.

Torpedo boat tender

The Foudre was first commissioned in 1896 as a torpedo boat tender (Croiseur porte-torpilleurs), with the role of helping bring torpedo boats to the high seas, and launch them for attack.

She was then modified as repair ship in 1907, as a minelayer in 1910, as a seaplane carrier in 1911 (depot, transport, and launch by crane), and seaplane carrier with a flying-off deck in 1913. She was initially converted to carry torpedo-carrying planes in hangars on the main deck. They were lowered on the sea with a crane.

First seaplane carrier
In April 1910, Vice-Admiral Auguste Boué de Lapeyrère, Navy Minister, established a committee to study the usage of balloons and planes by the navy.

Seaplane tender
On November 29, 1911, a navy airbase was established at Fréjus Saint-Raphaël, and the torpedo boat tender Foudre was sent to the naval yard in Toulon to be converted as a seaplane tender. The ship was fitted out in a totally new way. A deck was installed at the bow for the seaplane to take off. The seaplane would land on the water, and be craned on board for stowing.

A float-equipped Canard Voisin seaplane was bought by the navy for this purpose in December 1911. The Foudre would be stationed at Fréjus, working as a seaplane tender, allowing for stowage, repair and supply of the seaplanes. The ship was armed on April 15, 1912, and trials with the Canard Voisin then started.

On May 1, 1912, the Navy Ministry purchased several more seaplanes, a monoplane Breguet with a single float, a Nieuport with double float, and a converted Farman biplane.

Experiments at sea started with the Foudre in July 1912 during tactical exercises in the Mediterranean. The Canard Voisin, and a new foldable Nieuport were used. During the exercises, in which a wargame simulated the fight of two rival navies, the use of the Nieuport allowed the discovery of a surprise attack by the "adversary". During the summer  of 1912 many flights of the Canard Voisin from the Foudre were accomplished in the bay of Saint-Raphaël.

By the middle of 1913, the navy had 11 seaplane pilots. The Foudre was again used in large-scale naval exercises. One of its planes, a Nieuport used for observations, foiled a "surprise attack" by a group of warships. Five more seaplanes were ordered following these exercises.

Liftoff platform experiments

In November 1913, a 10-meter flying-off deck was installed, with the objective of using it for a Caudron G.3 seaplane. The plane successfully lifted off from the ship on May 8, 1914. At the beginning of the war, the platform was dismantled, and further experiments were postponed to a later date.

World War I

During World War I her roles were numerous, ranging from submarine tender to seaplane/aircraft transport, and headquarters ship in 1916. She was employed as an aviation school ship after the war.

Notes

Bibliography

Further reading

External links

 L'avènement de l'Aviation Maritime 
 Les hydravions des frères CAUDRON 
 Les Canards de Gabriel Voisin (HTML), PDF file with images

Ships built in France
1895 ships
Aircraft carriers of the French Navy
World War I naval ships of France